This is a list of places in the United States named for Nathanael Greene, a major general in the Continental Army during the American Revolutionary War, who was appointed by General George Washington as Quartermaster General of the United States Army on March 2, 1778.

Counties

Greene County, Alabama
Greene County, Arkansas
Greene County, Georgia
Greene County, Illinois
Greene County, Indiana
Greene County, Iowa
Green County, Kentucky
Greene County, Mississippi
Greene County, Missouri 
Greene County, New York
Greene County, North Carolina 
Greene County, Ohio
Greene County, Pennsylvania
Greenville County, South Carolina
Greene County, Tennessee
Greene County, Virginia
Green County, Wisconsin
Greensville County, Virginia (possibly; there are other claimed origins)

Cities, towns, and villages

Fort Greene, Brooklyn, New York
Greene, Maine
Greene, New York
Greene, Rhode Island
Greensboro, Alabama
Greensboro, Georgia
Greensboro, North Carolina
Greensboro, Pennsylvania
Greensburg, Pennsylvania
Greensburg, Kentucky
Greeneville, Tennessee
Greenville, New York
Greenville, Mississippi in Jefferson County
Greenville, Mississippi, in Washington County
Greenville, North Carolina
Greenville, Ohio
Greenville, Pennsylvania
Greenville, Rhode Island
Greenville, South Carolina
Greene Township, Franklin County, Pennsylvania
Greene Township, Pike County, Pennsylvania
Green Township, Hamilton County, Ohio

Other places
BSA, General Greene Council, Greensboro, North Carolina
Fort Greene Park in Brooklyn, New York
Fort Greene Ville, Ohio
General Greene Elementary School, Greensboro, North Carolina
General Greene Village Apartment Complex, Springfield, New Jersey
General Nathanael Greene Homestead,  Coventry, Rhode Island
Greene Central School, Greene, Maine
Greene Hall, State University of New York at Geneseo, Geneseo, New York
Green River (Kentucky)
Greeneville High School, Greeneville, Tennessee
Greeneville Middle School, Greeneville, Tennessee
Nathanael B. Greene Community Center, Guilford, Connecticut
Nathanael Greene Academy, Greensboro, Georgia
Nathanael Greene Army Reserve Center, Narragansett, Rhode Island
Nathanael Greene Elementary School, Chicago, Illinois
Nathanael Greene Elementary School, Liberty, North Carolina
Nathanael Greene Elementary School, Pawtucket, Rhode Island
Nathanael Greene Elementary School, Stanardsville, Virginia
Nathanael Greene Historical Foundation, Greensboro, Pennsylvania
Nathanael Greene/Close Memorial Park, Springfield, Missouri
Nathanael Greene Memorial Bridge Old Forge Road, Warwick North Kingstown Line,  Rhode Island
Nathanael Greene Middle School, Providence, Rhode Island
Nathanael Greene Museum, Greeneville, Tennessee
Nathanael Greene Park, Springfield, Missouri
Nathanael Greene's Publick House, Greene, New York
Natty Greene's Pub & Brewing Company, Greensboro, North Carolina
North Greene High School, Greeneville, Tennessee
South Greene High School, Greeneville, Tennessee
West Greene High School, Mosheim, Tennessee
Camp Greene (neighborhood), Charlotte, NC

See also
 USS General Greene, for the four United States Navy ships that have been named for Nathanael Greene.

Lists of places named after people
Lists of places in the United States